The 2016 Macau Open Grand Prix Gold will be the 21st grand prix's badminton tournament of the 2016 BWF Grand Prix Gold and Grand Prix. The tournament will be held at Tap Seac Multisport Pavilion Macau in Macau in the 29 November - 4 December 2016 and had a total purse of $120,000.

Men's singles

Seeds

  Chou Tien-chen (final)
  Ng Ka Long (withdrew)
  Srikanth Kidambi (withdrew)
  Hu Yun (second round)
  Wong Wing Ki (third round)
  Wang Tzu-wei (semifinals)
  H. S. Prannoy (first round)
  Wei Nan (second round)

Finals

Top half

Section 1

Section 2

Section 3

Section 4

Bottom half

Section 5

Section 6

Section 7

Section 8

Women's singles

Seeds

  Saina Nehwal (quarterfinals)
  P. V. Sindhu (withdrew)
  Cheung Ngan Yi (semifinals)
  Hsu Ya-ching (first round)
  Tee Jing Yi (second round)
  Chen Yufei (champion)
  Liang Xiaoyu (quarterfinals)
  Yip Pui Yin (first round)

Finals

Top half

Section 1

Section 2

Bottom half

Section 3

Section 4

Men's doubles

Seeds

  Chen Hung-ling / Wang Chi-lin (quarterfinals)
  Lee Jhe-huei / Lee Yang (champion)
  Manu Attri / B. Sumeeth Reddy (second round)
  Fajar Alfian / Muhammad Rian Ardianto (semifinals)
  Lu Kai / Zhang Nan (final)
  Wahyu Nayaka / Giovani Dicky Oktavan (first round)
  Lu Ching-yao / Yang Po-han (quarterfinals)
  Hardianto / Kenas Adi Haryanto (semifinals)

Finals

Top half

Section 1

Section 2

Bottom half

Section 3

Section 4

Women's doubles

Seeds

  Chen Qingchen / Jia Yifan (champion)
  Vivian Hoo Kah Mun / Woon Khe Wei (semifinals)
  Della Destiara Haris / Rosyita Eka Putri Sari (second round)
  Gabriela Stoeva / Stefani Stoeva (withdrew)

Finals

Top half

Section 1

Section 2

Bottom half

Section 3

Section 4

Mixed doubles

Seeds

  Chan Peng Soon / Goh Liu Ying (quarterfinals)
  Zheng Siwei / Chen Qingchen (withdrew)
  Tan Kian Meng / Lai Pei Jing (semifinals)
  Lee Chun Hei / Chau Hoi Wah (semifinals)
  Terry Hee Yong Kai / Tan Wei Han (quarterfinals)
  Hafiz Faisal / Shella Devi Aulia (first round)
  Tang Chun Man / Tse Ying Suet (final)
  Alfian Eko Prasetya / Annisa Saufika (quarterfinals)

Finals

Top half

Section 1

Section 2

Bottom half

Section 3

Section 4

References

Macau Open Badminton Championships
Macau Open
Macau Open